Tenualosa is a genus of fish in the family Clupeidae. When subfamilies are recognized, it is placed in the subfamily Alosinae (the shads) or Dorosomatinae (gizzard shads).

Species 
There are currently five recognized species in this genus:
 Tenualosa ilisha (F. Hamilton, 1822) (Hilsa shad)
 Tenualosa macrura (Bleeker, 1852) (Longtail shad)
 Tenualosa reevesii (J. Richardson, 1846) (Reeves' shad)
 Tenualosa thibaudeaui (J. Durand, 1940) (Laotian shad)
 Tenualosa toli (Valenciennes, 1847) (Toli shad)

References

 
Ray-finned fish genera
Taxa named by Henry Weed Fowler
Taxonomy articles created by Polbot